Lev Borisovich Helfand was a Soviet chargé d'affaires to Italy in the end of 1939. Born in Artemivka , Crimea  on December 29, 1900, he was in Italy during the 1930s, coinciding with the time that the National Fascist Party was in power.  When he was recalled to Moscow in 1940, he chose to flee to the United States with his wife Sofia Evzarovna Shatsova (Sonia Moore), fearing deportation to Siberia or being killed at once. He died in New York in 1957.

References 

Soviet Jews
Soviet diplomats
1900 births
Year of death missing